Parnara ganga, the continental swift, is a butterfly belonging to the family Hesperiidae. It is found in India and south-east Asia, including Vietnam.

References

Hesperiinae
Butterflies of Asia
Butterflies of Indochina